Snooper and Blabber is one of the three segments from The Quick Draw McGraw Show. This show was produced by Hanna-Barbera between September 19, 1959 and October 20, 1961, and consists of 45 episodes.

History
Snooper and Blabber form a pair of cat and mouse detectives, respectively, working for the Super Snooper Detective Agency. Daws Butler voiced both characters although the first four episodes originally featured a different actor, Elliot Field, as the voice of Blabber Mouse. Michael Maltese crafted the stories. The characters have appeared in other Hanna-Barbera cartoons, including Scooby's All-Star Laff-A-Lympics and Yogi's Treasure Hunt.

Super Snooper is more or less the one in command whenever the pair takes on a case while Blabber Mouse (a play on “blabbermouth”, not to be confused with the Merrie Melodies character Little Blabbermouse) follows whatever orders Snooper gives him. Snooper's voice was patterned after Ed Gardner's Archie on the 1940s radio show Duffy's Tavern. Blabber speaks with a lisp, hence he calls his senior partner "Shnooper." It was one of the rare shows that paired a cat and mouse that were not enemies. Also, Snooper makes frequent contact with his agent Hazel who is never shown, but is revealed to have a Parakeet as a pet.

Some of the pair's cartoons featured early versions of other Hanna-Barbera characters, such as Snagglepuss and Hardy Har Har.

Appearances on Quick Draw McGraw
Snooper and Blabber starred in the following seven-minute cartoons on The Quick Draw McGraw Show:

Season 1 (1959–1960)

Season 2 (1960)

Season 3 (1961)

Later appearances

Hanna-Barbera
Snooper and Blabber appeared in the 1972 TV-movie Yogi's Ark Lark, which was part of The ABC Saturday Superstar Movie and also the pilot for Yogi’s Gang. They also appear in the 1982 special Yogi Bear's All Star Comedy Christmas Caper.

The duo later appeared in the following Hanna-Barbera cartoon series:
 The Yogi Bear Show, to see Yogi at his birthday party.
 Laff-A-Lympics, as members of Yogi’s team.
 Yogi's Treasure Hunt, as regular characters.
 Yo Yogi!, with Snooper voiced by Rob Paulsen and Blabber voiced by Hal Smith. Snooper was a celebrity detective while Blabber ran the "Crooks 'n' Books Store" at Jellystone Mall.
 The Super Secret Secret Squirrel segment (episode “Agent Penny") of 2 Stupid Dogs. Rob Paulsen reprises Snooper here and also voices Blabber.
 Snooper made a brief cameo appearance (without Blabber) in the 1988 TV-movie The Good, the Bad, and Huckleberry Hound.
 Snooper and Blabber appeared in DC Comics Deathstroke/Yogi Bear Special #1 as captured animals alongside other Hanna-Barbera characters.
 Snooper and Blabber both appear in the series Jellystone!. In the series, Snooper (voiced by Georgie Kidder) is female and Blabber (voiced by Bernardo de Paula) has facial hair. Blabber lacks a lisp in this series.
 Snooper and Blabber are shown on a list in the Velma episode "Velma Makes a List".

Other media
Snooper and Blabber made appearances in a number of comic books, and had their own title from Gold Key Comics, which only ran for three issues (1962–1963).

In the mid-1960s, Snooper and Blabber were the stars of two LP albums from Hanna-Barbera Records:
 James Bomb, in which the duo were involved in a James Bond-type adventure; the record included songs with titles like “Dr. Oh No” and “Gold Pinky.”
 Monster Shindig, in which Snooper and Blabber are called to investigate a loud party, which is being thrown by The Gruesomes. Paul Frees voiced Snooper and June Foray voiced Blabber on this record.

In a 2007 episode of Robot Chicken, "Ban on the Fun", Snooper and Blabber appear in the "Laff-A-Munich" skit, confronting the Great Fondoo who was holding the groceries after the Really Rottens have murdered the majority of the Yogi Yahooeys. Snooper asks Fondoo, "Do you know why we're here?" However, the Great Fondoo questions why HE is there, stating he is a nobody and that Hanna-Barbera should've had plenty of other villains to make up the Really Rottens. Snooper and Blabber then shoot him to death.

See also
 Quick Draw McGraw
 List of works produced by Hanna-Barbera
 List of Hanna-Barbera characters

References

External links
 Snooper and Blabber according to Wingnut

1950s American animated television series
1960s American animated television series
1959 American television series debuts
1961 American television series endings
American detective television series
American children's animated mystery television series
Animated television series about cats
Animated television series about mice and rats
Crossover animated television series
English-language television shows
First-run syndicated television programs in the United States
Hanna-Barbera characters
Television series by Hanna-Barbera
Yogi Bear characters